Lady Wu may refer to:

Lady Wu (Sun Jian's wife) (died 202)
Empress Wu (Zhaolie) (died 245)
Wu Zetian (624–705)
Consort Wu (Xuanzong) (died 737)
Lady Wu (Qian Liu's wife) (858–919)
Wu Hanyue (913–952)
Empress Wu (Song dynasty) (1115–1197)
Empress Wu (Chenghua) (died 1509)

See also
Wu (surname)
Lady Wu: The First Empress, 2004 Chinese TV series